The Carle Place Union Free School District is a school district that serves all of Carle Place and parts of Westbury and Mineola in central Nassau County, Long Island, New York, United States.

Schools

Cherry Lane School
Cherry Lane Primary School is a three-year comprehensive public primary school located in the hamlet of Carle Place in Nassau County, New York. The school runs grades K-2.

Rushmore Avenue School
Rushmore Avenue Elementary School is a four-year comprehensive public elementary school located in the hamlet of Carle Place in Nassau County, New York. The school is for grades 3–6, whose 6th grade runs a middle school type process for getting around classes.

Carle Place Middle/High School
Carle Place Middle/High School is a six-year comprehensive public high school located in the hamlet of Carle Place in Nassau County, New York. Its Middle School runs grades 7-8 and High School runs grades 9–12.

Notable alumni
 Matt Snell, former pro football player for the New York Jets.
 Joe Satriani, guitar virtuoso and instrumentalist. Lead guitarist for Chickenfoot. Played with Deep Purple, Mick Jagger, etc.
 Steve Vai, another guitar virtuoso who was one of Joe Satriani's students.

References

External links 

 Official website

Carle Place, New York
Town of North Hempstead, New York
Schools in Nassau County, New York
School districts in New York (state)
School districts established in 1915